Dondogdorjyn Erdenebat is a Mongolian politician, who was the Governor of Baganuur district of Ulan bator city. He served as Secretary General for Democratic Party of Mongolia. Currently he is a State Great Khural member.

Early life and education 
He was born in Zuunkharaa, Selenge province of Mongolia in 1959. He studied at 1st secondary school in Zuunkharaa between 1967-1977. 
After  graduating from secondary school, he went to Irkutsk, Russia for higher education. There, he studied at Engineering Department of Irkutsk State University.

Career in politics 
Between 1996-2000, he was member of Representatives for Ulan Bator city. Meanwhile, he was also leading member of Representatives for Baganuur district. In 1998, he was elected as vice-president of Mongolian Volleyball Association in 1998.

Since 2000, he has been member of National Consultative Committee and Executive Committee of Democratic Party of Mongolia. 
Between 1998-2006, he was chairman of Baganuur provincial party association of Democratic Party of Mongolia.

Secretary General of Democratic Party of Mongolia 

Since 2009, he served as Secretary General for Democratic Party of Mongolia. He led 2012 election campaign of his party as Secretary General and Democratic Party won that election. He elected for State Great Khural member.

References

1959 births
Living people
Democratic Party (Mongolia) politicians
Irkutsk State University alumni
People from Selenge Province